James Lye (born 17 June 1969), born James Lye Tiang Kang, is a banking executive and former Mediacorp Singaporean television and Raintree Pictures movie actor.

Education
Lye was educated at Anglo-Chinese School and Anglo-Chinese Junior College in Singapore, and at Arizona State University in the United States.

Professional background
Lye first entered the entertainment industry in 1996 with the former Television Corporation of Singapore and has starred in both English and Chinese shows. He left the industry after a brief acting career. His last drama was The Millennium Bug in 1999. Lye has since worked in the banking sector and was the head of markets with Citibank International Personal Bank in Singapore. He was recruited as the global head of international banking by Standard Chartered Bank in October 2022.

Personal life
On 27 June 2004, Lye married former Channel NewsAsia presenter Diana Ser after a nine-year courtship. The couple have a son, Jake, and two daughters, Christy and Jaymee.

Accolades

Filmography

Movies
 The Truth About Jane and Sam (1999)
 2000 AD (2000)
 When I Fall in Love... with Both (2000)

References

External links
 
 'Hong Kong Cinemagic website'
 'MediaCorp News Article dated June 29, 2004 by Elisa Chia'

Anglo-Chinese School alumni
Anglo-Chinese Junior College alumni
Arizona State University alumni
1969 births
Living people
Singaporean television personalities
Singaporean people of Hakka descent